Magda Kun (17 February 1912 – 7 November 1945) was a Hungarian stage and film actress. She was born at Szászrégen and made her stage debut in Budapest. She married actor Steven Geray in 1934, appearing alongside him in the 1935 film Dance Band. Kun died in 1945, in London, aged 33 years.

Selected filmography
 The Old Scoundrel (1932)
 And the Plains Are Gleaming (1933)
 Dance Band (1934)
 Old Mother Riley in Paris (1938)
 Room for Two (1939)
 Old Mother Riley Overseas (1943)
 Heaven Is Round the Corner (1944)
 Meet Sexton Blake (1945)
 Dead of Night (1945)

References

Bibliography
 Hodgson, Michael. Patricia Roc. Author House, 2013.

External links
 

1912 births
1945 deaths
People from Reghin
Hungarian film actresses
Hungarian stage actresses
Hungarian emigrants to England